Horton Point Light is a lighthouse on the north side of Eastern Long Island, New York in the hamlet of Southold. The lighthouse and the grounds surrounding it are under the supervision of the Town of Southold Park District.

History
The current lighthouse was built and the tower was first lit in 1857. The tower was automated in 1933 and is now operational. The light was deactivated from 1933 to 1990. The foundation is granite and the lighthouse is built out of granite and brick with stucco. A square tower is attached to a rectangular house. The tower is white with a black lantern and a copper dome. The light has a slow green flash every ten seconds.

Chronology
1790: President George Washington commissioned the lighthouse.
1855: Land to build to lighthouse on was purchased by the US government for $550.
1857: Lighthouse was constructed and lit with William Sinclair serving as the first light keeper.
1933: Light was turned off in the tower and a skeleton tower was lit on shore.
1934: In January, Southold Park District purchased lighthouse buildings and grounds from the US Department of Commerce for $1.00.
1938: The last keeper stayed until the hurricane of 1938.
1976: Restoration of the lighthouse was started.
1990: Major restoration allowed for the repair of the tower both internally and externally.  The light was reopened and relit.  The skeleton tower (seen in photo to right) on the shoreline was removed.
1994: Property is listed on the National Register of Historic Places
2007: The lighthouse is still an active aid to navigation and hosts a museum. Visitors are able to climb the tower.

Reference list

External links

Long Island lighthouses article
Southold Historical Society: Nautical Museum at Horton Point Lighthouse 
Horton Point Lighthouse; Art & Architecture Quarterly / East End

Lighthouses completed in 1857
Lighthouses completed in 1933
Lighthouses on the National Register of Historic Places in New York (state)
Museums in Suffolk County, New York
Lighthouse museums in New York (state)
Tourist attractions on Long Island
National Register of Historic Places in Suffolk County, New York
1857 establishments in New York (state)
Lighthouses in Suffolk County, New York